Simona Halep was the defending champion, but she retired in the quarterfinals against Marie Bouzková.

Bianca Andreescu won the title after Serena Williams retired in the final due to back spasms, with the scoreline at 3–1. Andreescu became the first Canadian to win the event since Faye Urban won the title in 1969.

Naomi Osaka regained the WTA No. 1 singles ranking, after Ashleigh Barty losing in the second round and Karolína Plíšková in the quarterfinals to eventual champion Andreescu.

Seeds
The top eight seeds received a bye into the second round.

Draw

Finals

Top half

Section 1

Section 2

Bottom half

Section 3

Section 4

Qualifying

Seeds

Qualifiers

Lucky loser
  Zhang Shuai

Qualifying draw

First qualifier

Second qualifier

Third qualifier

Fourth qualifier

Fifth qualifier

Sixth qualifier

Seventh qualifier

Eighth qualifier

Ninth qualifier

Tenth qualifier

Eleventh qualifier

Twelfth qualifier

References

External links
Main draw
Qualifying draw

Women's Singles